The Rye is a stream rising east of Ashtead and flowing into the River Mole near Leatherhead, Surrey.

Course
The Rye Brook flows westwards across Ashtead Common, through the Ashtead Common National Nature Reserve, managed by the City of London Corporation. For much of its course the brook follows a straight channelled course which was dug during the Second World War in order to drain the surrounding land so that it could be used for agriculture. Under a recent (2005) initiative by the City of London Corporation, parts of the course have been remodelled. The remodelling includes meandering and reprofiling the riverbed, banks and adjacent land to create a more natural setting, in order to create a wetland habitat that will encourage a diverse wildlife.

Water quality
The Environment Agency measures the water quality of the river systems in England. Each is given an overall ecological status, which may be one of five levels: high, good, moderate, poor and bad. There are several components that are used to determine this, including biological status, which looks at the quantity and varieties of invertebrates, angiosperms and fish. Chemical status, which compares the concentrations of various chemicals against known safe concentrations, is rated good or fail.

Water quality of the Rye in 2019:

References

External links
 - A Vision for Ashtead Rye Meadows Wetlands

Rivers of Surrey
1Rye